The Central Basketball League was an early regional professional or semi-pro basketball league based in Ohio and Pennsylvania. The league disbanded on November 12, 1912, after playing a few exhibition games.  Joseph "Joe" Meech Leithead served as Secretary prior to 1908 and President of the League for four years 1908–1912.  Previously, Leithead was coach and captain of the Pittsburgh's South Side team from 1899 to 1907. "Joe Leithead Retires from the Floor Game"  10/20/43 Pittsburgh Sun Telegraph article by Harry Keck (sports editor) "Low Score Basketball Games Recalled by Vets' Reunion - Joe Leithead Honor Guest".

Complete team list

Champions
1906/07 East Liverpool Potters & Pittsburgh South Side
1907/08 East Liverpool Potters
1908/09 Homestead Young Americans
1909/10 McKeesport Tubers
1910/11 McKeesport Tubers
1911/12 Johnstown Johnnies
1912/13 LEAGUE DISBANDED

External links 
 APBR list of teams and standings

Defunct basketball leagues in the United States
Basketball in Ohio
Basketball in Pennsylvania